The 2010 Turkish GP2 round was a GP2 Series motor race held on May 29 and May 30, 2010 at the Istanbul Park in Istanbul, Turkey. It was the third race of the 2010 GP2 Series. The race was used to support the 2010 Turkish Grand Prix.

Report

Feature Race
Pastor Maldonado became the fifth winner in as many races in GP2 in 2010 following a dominant victory in Turkey. Rapax driver Maldonado got past polesitter Davide Valsecchi (iSport) at the start and never looked troubled, lapping up to a second quicker than his rivals before slowing down in the final stages of the race and settling for a huge victory margin of 17.9 seconds. There was rather more competition for the remaining podium places. Valsecchi spent the first stint trying to hold off Sergio Pérez, only for the Mexican to leapfrog him in the pits. But Pérez's pace began to fade dramatically as the race progressed and Valsecchi capitalised with a nice move at the end of lap 26 to reclaim second. That was Valsecchi's afternoon sorted, but Pérez now had ART's Sam Bird to worry about, and after a prolonged battled the Briton came out on top to steal the final podium spot, leaving Pérez to just barely hold off Addax team-mate Giedo van der Garde for fourth. By comparison, Maldonado's Rapax team-mate Luiz Razia had a relatively serene drive to sixth, but there was more action just behind him. DPR's Giacomo Ricci and Racing Engineering's Christian Vietoris were disputing the final point for eighth when they made contact and sailed off the track, allowing Ricci's stablemate Michael Herck past. Vietoris continued, but Ricci was forced to retire. Not content with provisional pole for Sunday, Herck then dispensed with Racing Engineering's Dani Clos for seventh, and Clos later dropped behind Vietoris to inadvertently give the German pole position for the sprint race. iSport's third-place qualifier Oliver Turvey had a terrible afternoon, losing two spots off the start and then being dealt a drivethrough penalty for moving twice to defend his position. It was while honouring that penalty that he was then picked up for speeding in pitlane, resulting in another drive-through and an eventual finishing position of 15th. Scuderia Coloni lost both cars late in the race when Vladimir Arabadzhiev crashed into the tyre wall with two laps remaining and Alberto Valerio spun and stalled moments later, while Super Nova's Marcus Ericsson was forced to park at mid-distance when his engine exploded. The other major incident occurred much earlier, when Spain feature race winner Charles Pic and ART's Jules Bianchi found themselves on the same patch of Turn 3 at the same time; the resultant collision putting both out of the race.

Sprint Race
Dani Clos claimed his maiden GP2 victory with a dominant lights-to-flag win in the sprint race at Istanbul Park. The 21-year-old held off the challenge of Racing Engineering team-mate Christian Vietoris into the first corner to lead, taking the chequered flag 23 laps later 8.8 seconds ahead of Rapax driver Luiz Razia to become the sixth GP2 winner in six races in 2010. Vietoris had looked on course to make it a comfortable one-two for the Spanish team, only to retire with a mechanical problem, which left Razia to take an easy runner-up spot. Addax's Giedo van de Garde claimed third place after getting ahead of third-place starter Michael Herck (DPR) on the opening lap, but he had to absorb pressure from race one pole position starter David Valsecchi throughout the race. Herck shadowed iSport's Valsecchi to the finish to take fifth place, with race one winner Pastor Maldonado (Rapax) taking the final point for sixth place to consolidate his championship lead but unable to get on terms with the three-car group ahead of him. DAMS driver Jérôme d'Ambrosio, a race-winner in Monaco in the previous round, lost seventh place to the inspired Sergio Pérez on the last lap. The Barwa Addax driver had started from the back of the grid after being found to be underweight following his fourth-place finish in the feature race, but made up 11 places in the opening laps. ART's Sam Bird ended up 10th after being passed by d'Ambrosio, Pérez and Ho-Pin Tung in quick succession in the closing laps after suddenly dropping to around two seconds off the pace. His team-mate Jules Bianchi was involved in some hectic midfield racing but could only make it up to 13th after his early retirement yesterday. Arden's Charles Pic – the man Bianchi tangled with in the feature race – missed today's round due to food poisoning. Former McLaren AUTOSPORT BRDC award winner Oliver Turvey's nightmare weekend ended with 18th place after stalling on the grid and then being hit with a drive-through penalty.

Classification

Qualifying

Notes
1. – Rodolfo González received a three-place grid penalty because of impeding Michael Herck in qualifying.

Feature Race

Sprint Race

Standings after the round

Drivers' Championship standings

Teams' Championship standings

 Note: Only the top five positions are included for both sets of standings.

See also 
 2010 Turkish Grand Prix
 2010 Istanbul Park GP3 Series round

External links
 GP2 Series official web site: Results

References

Istanbul Park
Istanbul Park GP2 Series round